Ivan Aleksandrovich Danshin (born 20 April 1982) is a former Russian professional footballer.

Club career
He made his professional debut in the Russian Second Division in 1999 for PFC CSKA-d Moscow.

Honours
 Russian Cup finalist: 2000.

References

1982 births
Living people
Russian footballers
Association football forwards
PFC CSKA Moscow players
FC Moscow players
FC Kuban Krasnodar players
FC Zirka Kropyvnytskyi players
FC Chernomorets Novorossiysk players
Russian Premier League players
Ukrainian First League players
Russian expatriate footballers
Expatriate footballers in Ukraine